The Cultural Pyramid of Cilento (Italian: Piramide Culturale del Cilento) is a geometric drawing created in 2020 by the poet Menotti Lerro. The Pyramid shape came out adding the "Cultural Triangle" founded by Lerro at the historical summits of high cultural tradition of the Cilento area.

The Triangle inside the Pyramid
The Triangle starts from Omignano (and from Monte Stella (Cilento)) - "The Aphorisms Village", and then joins Salento - "The Poetry Village" and Vallo della Lucania - "Seat of the Contemporary Center of the Arts", summit, the latter, which also coincides with the center of the base of the entire Pyramid.
On 13 July 2022 the mayor of the municipality of Salento Cilento, Gabriele De Marco, symbolically gift the territory to found the Republic of Poets (a micronation located in Salento Cilento) with an official letter sent to the poet Menotti Lerro.

Mountain and villages involved

The Pyramid vertices are: Monte Stella (Cilento) (with his megaliths which are recognized as the empathic ancient gods of the Movement), Omignano, Salento, Vallo della Lucania, Palinuro, Paestum, Velia. In 2021, with an official paper of the city hall, also Trentinara - "The Village of Love" joined.
On 02 August 2022 also Vatolla joined as "The Village of Otium".
On 06 August 2022 also Piano Vetrale joined as "The Murales Village".
In the same month also San Mauro Cilento adhered as "Village of incunaboli e cinquecentine".
In addition also Massicelle adhered as "Village of Toys", while Casal Velino came together as "Landfall Village".
In the end a last village adhered: Agropoli - "The Village of the Castle".

Empathism

Within the "Cultural Triangle of ancient Cilento" the new movement of "La Scuola Empatica" (Empathism) rose in 2020, which bases its formal theories on the New Manifesto of Arts where many authors, visual artists, musicians, philosophers and intellectuals came together.

References

Bibliography
Menotti Lerro, La scuola Empatica: movimento letterario-artistico-filosofico e culturale sorto in Italia nel 2020 (Ladolfi: 2020) 
Menotti Lerro, Antonello Pelliccia, New Manifesto of Arts (Zona: 2020) 
Empatismo / Scuola empatica, on Riscontri Magazine

External links 

 The Three Schools of Salerno Province: Scuola Empatica, Scuola Eleatica, Scuola Medica Salernitana
 European Heritage Days
 Giornate Europee del Patrimonio - Empatismo

Avant-garde art
Italian art
Theories of aesthetics